Good Morning is a Russian morning television program and talk show that is broadcast on Channel One (Russia). It debuted in 1986, and has aired ever since.

The program features news, interviews, and weather forecasts. The primary anchors are Tatyana Vedeneyeva (1988—1996, 2000), Larisa Verbitskaya  (1987—2014), Ekaterina Andreeva (1992—1993), Andrey Malakhov  (1995—2001), Arina Sharapova (2001—present), Yekaterina Strizhenova (1997—present), Larisa Krivtsova  (1997—2003), Alexander Nevsky (1999), Yana Churikova (2002), Irina Apeksimova (2006—2008), Boris Shcherbakov (2007—2014) and Marina Kim (2014–present).

Program team

Television presenters 

 Yekaterina Strizhenova
 Yulia Zimina
 Svetlana Zeynalova
 Timur Soloviev
 Olga Ushakova
 Roman Budnikov
 Anastasia Tregubova
 Irina Muromtseva
 Sergey Babaev
 Anastasia Orlova
 Polina Tsvetkova
 Evgeny Pokrovsky

Reporters 

 Sergey Abramov-Sotnik
 Dmitry Kuzmin
 Alexander Zheleznov
 Elizaveta Nikishova
 Anna Soldatova
 Margarita Ilyina
 Natalia Kovaleva
 Ruslan Yunyaev
 Olga Yakunina
 Anastasia Savelyeva
 Natalia Lyubchenko
 Maria Osadnik
 Karina Makaryan
 Svetlana Neimanis

References

External links 
 

1980s Soviet television series
1990s Russian television series
2000s Russian television series
2010s Russian television series
Breakfast television
Channel One Russia original programming
Russian television news shows